Schleusen Bridge (German: Schleusenbrücke) is a bridge in Mitte, Berlin, Germany.

External links
 

Bridges in Berlin
Mitte